Malolo Lailai Airport  is an airport on the Malolo Lailai island in the Fiji's Western Division. The airport is a short strip running the width of the island, and is mainly used for general aviation and transporting guests to resorts on the island, such as Musket Cove Resort, Lomani Island Resort and Plantation Island Resort.

Airlines and destinations

References 

Airports in Fiji